Mak Varešanović (born 28 August 1998) is a Bosnian professional footballer who plays as a midfielder.

Club career
Before joining Casertana, Varešanović played for Serie A club Udinese.

On 7 July 2021, he signed a two-year contract with Slovenian club Koper.

Personal life
Varešanović comes from a footballing family. His father, Mirza Varešanović, earned over 20 caps for Bosnia and Herzegovina.  His grandfather Mirsad Fazlagić captained Yugoslavia at UEFA Euro 1968, while his brother Dal plays professionally for Bosnian Premier League club Sarajevo.

Honours
Olimpik 
Bosnian Cup: 2014–15

References

External links

1998 births
Living people
Sportspeople from Bursa
Association football midfielders
Bosnia and Herzegovina footballers
Bosnia and Herzegovina youth international footballers
Bosnia and Herzegovina under-21 international footballers
FK Olimpik players
Udinese Calcio players
Casertana F.C. players
FC Koper players
Premier League of Bosnia and Herzegovina players
Serie C players
Slovenian PrvaLiga
Bosnia and Herzegovina expatriate footballers
Expatriate footballers in Italy
Bosnia and Herzegovina expatriate sportspeople in Italy
Expatriate footballers in Slovenia
Bosnia and Herzegovina expatriate sportspeople in Slovenia